Lionel Seymour Wells (3 February 1870 – 26 April 1928) was an English first-class cricketer active 1896–1911 who played for Middlesex and London County.

References

1870 births
1928 deaths
English cricketers
Middlesex cricketers
London County cricketers
W. G. Grace's XI cricketers
A. J. Webbe's XI cricketers